Cosmetalepas massieri is a species of sea snail, a marine gastropod mollusk in the family Fissurellidae.

Description

The shell can grow to be 61 mm in length.

Distribution
Cosmetalepas massieri can be found off of Namibia.

Original description
   Poppe G.T., Tagaro S.P. & Sarino J.C. (2011) Two new species of Fissurellidae from Namibia. Visaya 3(4): 71-75. [November 2011]
page(s): 71.

References

External links
 Worms Link

Fissurellidae